Art Pepper Meets the Rhythm Section is a 1957 jazz album by saxophonist Art Pepper with Red Garland, Paul Chambers, and Philly Joe Jones, who were the rhythm section for Miles Davis's quintet at the time. The album is considered a milestone in Pepper's career.

Recording 
According to Pepper, the album was recorded under enormous pressure, as he first learned of the recording session the morning he was due in the studio, and he had never met the other musicians, all of whom he greatly admired. He was playing on an instrument in a bad state of repair, and was suffering from a drug problem. Purportedly, Pepper had not played the saxophone for some time, either for two weeks (according to the liner notes), or six months (according to Pepper's autobiography Straight Life). However, the discography in Straight Life indicates that Pepper had recorded many sessions in the previous weeks, including one five days earlier.

Reception 

Michael G. Nastos of AllMusic called the recording "a classic east meets west, cool plus hot but never lukewarm combination that provides many bright moments for the quartet during this exceptional date from that great year in music, 1957."

Brian Morton and Richard Cook, writing for The Penguin Jazz Guide (10th ed.), described Meets the Rhythm Section as "a poetic, burning date, with all four men playing above themselves…. Between them, they'd delivered a masterpiece."  In previous Penguin Guide editions, the album was included in the "Core Collection," and received a four-star rating (of a possible four stars).

Becky Byrkit, writing for AllMusic, deemed the album "a diamond of recorded jazz history."

The New York Times critic Ben Ratliff described Meets the Rhythm Section as "an honest record; if you believe the story of its making, you'd have to conclude that Pepper, unprepared and unarmored, was forced to pull the music out of himself, since tepid run-throughs and stock licks weren't going to work in such exalted company."

Track listing
"You'd Be So Nice to Come Home To" (Cole Porter) – 5:25
"Red Pepper Blues" (Art Pepper, Red Garland) – 3:37
"Imagination" (Jimmy Van Heusen, Johnny Burke) – 5:52
"Waltz Me Blues" (Art Pepper, Paul Chambers) – 2:56
"Straight Life" (Art Pepper) – 3:59
"Jazz Me Blues" (Tom Delaney) – 4:47
"Tin Tin Deo" (Gil Fuller, Chano Pozo) – 7:42
"Star Eyes" (Gene de Paul, Don Raye) – 5:12
"Birks' Works" (Dizzy Gillespie) – 4:17
"The Man I Love" (George Gershwin, Ira Gershwin) – 6:36 [added to the remastered recording in 2002]
(Recorded on January 19, 1957 at Contemporary's Studios, Los Angeles.)

Personnel
Art Pepper - alto saxophone
Red Garland - piano
Paul Chambers - bass
Philly Joe Jones - drums

References

1957 albums
Art Pepper albums
Contemporary Records albums
Original Jazz Classics albums